James Heath-Clark (born August 13, 1985), known professionally as Honey Davenport, is an American drag performer, singer, songwriter, actor and activist. Davenport was a longtime fixture of the New York City nightlife scene and came to international attention as a contestant on season 11 of RuPaul's Drag Race. Born in West Philadelphia, Heath-Clark attended college for musical theatre in New York, where he began his career as a backup dancer for Peppermint. He later established his own dance group, The Hunties. After taking up drag, Davenport became active in the pageant circuit of that community, winning 18 titles between 2013 and 2018. In 2013, she and her band, Electrohoney, released an eponymous album and starred in a live rock opera called The Electric Highway. She also performed in two off-Broadway shows, The Orion Experience (2013) and Trinkets (2017–2018). In the latter, she played the leading role.

While her season of Drag Race aired in 2019, Davenport released singles and music videos off of her debut EP, Raw and Unfiltered. Since then, she has launched a solo musical career; embarked on domestic and international tours; and appeared as both a host and a guest on web series about drag, culture and current events. In the second half of 2019, she starred in two off-off-Broadway shows: Raw and Unfiltered, a live adaptation of her EP, and Stocking Stuffer: A Christmas Show with Balls, a holiday-themed performance. In early 2020, she and Aja released "Draw the Blood", a song whose accompanying music video marked her first directorial credit. Since the start of the COVID-19 pandemic, Davenport has produced songs, music videos and web content, sometimes in remote collaboration with other artists. Her second EP, Love Is God, was released in January 2022. She is set to co-star in a feature-length film called God Save the Queens, which will debut at the Palm Springs International Film Festival in January 2023.

Davenport centers most of her art on social justice themes. She was motivated to take up political activism for a number of reasons: losing family and friends to gun violence as a child, being the victim of police brutality as a young adult, and experiencing incidents of racism throughout life. She has also been vocal about transgender rights, especially within the drag community. In October 2018, Davenport attracted national media attention for quitting her longtime job as a show host at The Monster, a Manhattan gay bar, in protest of racism she encountered there.

Early life 

Heath-Clark was born James Clark on August 13, 1985, in West Philadelphia. He was raised primarily by his mother, who taught him to express his feelings by rapping. Of his early years, he said, "I grew up... in the projects, and I lost countless family members and friends to gun violence. I have been held at gunpoint more than once. It's the world I grew up in, [guns] were so easily accessible to my friends and to my enemies."

Affected by those experiences and by racism he encountered, Heath-Clark began writing poetry about social justice when he was 10 years old. Also interested in music, he was a member of his church choir and started writing songs at 13. He practiced boxing as a childhood hobby and took up spoken word poetry as a teenager. In high school, he was in the Junior Reserve Officers' Training Corps (JROTC), where he achieved the rank of squadron commander and served as captain of his rifle team. While attending the Pennsylvania Governor's School for the Arts when he was 15, Heath-Clark and a female friend went to a "come as you are not" party costumed as one another; he cites this as his first time dressing in drag. At 17, he moved to New York City to study musical theatre at the American Musical and Dramatic Academy. For a time, he lived in Harlem, on the same block as Drag Race season 6 contestant Vivacious, season 2 contestant Sahara Davenport and season 9 runner-up Peppermint.

Path to drag 

After college, Heath-Clark was in the cast of the Broadway national tour of Hairspray. It was there that he had his first experience with drag as a performance art, and this motivated him to subsequently take up work as a backup dancer for Peppermint for four years. He also danced in music videos for Sherry Vine. In anticipation of a month-long tour of Europe with Peppermint in 2008, Heath-Clark decided to earn spending money for his travels by putting on dance shows with a friend; the two called their act The Hunties. To encourage people from the drag community to attend their shows, they incorporated elements of drag into their routines. After his friend left to pursue other endeavors, Heath-Clark decided to continue performing alone as a drag queen. Shortly before the group disbanded, he met RuPaul at a book signing, where the latter misheard the name of The Hunties and made out an autograph to "Honey". From this, Heath-Clark took Honey as his drag name, adopting the Davenport surname from his drag mother, Lady Deja Davenport, who had recently begun mentoring him. His neighbor Sahara Davenport, who had the same drag mother as Deja and was therefore his drag aunt, also taught him tricks of the trade. He credits both Sahara and her partner, Manila Luzon, as teachers who influenced his style. He cites Kevin Aviance, Phylicia Rashad and Beyoncé as artistic inspirations. Heath-Clark's first performance in drag was on April 20, 2008, and his first paid appearance as Honey Davenport was at a show with Bob the Drag Queen. Early in his career, when his aesthetic was more androgynous, Heath-Clark went by the name Sir Honey Davenport. He dropped the "Sir" as his look became more feminine.

Career

Nightlife and pageantry 

Davenport has hosted regular drag shows in New York City, in New Jersey, on Fire Island and in Key West. She also works as a DJ. For her contributions to queer New York City nightlife, she has received six Glam Awards—prizes à la the Oscars issued to members of that community in an annual ceremony. The categories she has won include Club Party of the Year (2017), Door Goddess (2017 and 2018), Best Hostess (2019) and Best Video (2020). She was also named Music Artist of the Year at the 2020 edition of GIANT Fest, a queer music festival in Brooklyn.

Prior to appearing on Drag Race, Davenport was a frequent competitor in drag pageants, where she amassed a total of 18 titles by 2018. The first pageant she ever competed in was Miss Stonewall, which she attempted four times before winning in 2015. Fourteen of her victories fell in the three-year period between 2013 and 2016. Notable among these was the national crown of Miss'd America 2015. Concurrent with that reign, she held seven other titles. In February 2018, Davenport won the Miss Paradise pageant in Asbury Park, New Jersey. She had been performing at Paradise, the nightclub that hosts that pageant, since Sahara Davenport first brought her there years earlier.

Early music, theatre and television work 

In the early 2010s, Davenport fronted Electrohoney, a synth-pop band that released an eponymous album in 2013. Shortly after the album's completion, the band created and starred in The Electric Highway, a live, interactive rock opera featuring  a soundtrack of their songs. Set in 2092 New York, The Electric Highways narrative focuses on Davenport (playing herself) as she embarks on a quest to become a legend. The production explores themes related to gender and sexuality in a dystopian future. All three members of Electrohoney—Davenport, SteveX and Jesse Gray—as well as Deja Davenport, Sherry Vine and Jeremy Xtravaganza, played major roles. J. C. Alvarez of EDGE Media Network reviewed the show favorably, also noting that its opening night suffered from technical problems. Of the musical as a whole, he said, "What Electrohoney and company deliver with their musical rock-opera is a joyful reminder of the creativity that once thrived on the Lower East Side's underground club scene of the 80's, which disappeared into the mass consumer-driven 90's, and totally vanished during the height of the AIDS epidemic."

In summer 2013, Davenport acted in the off-Broadway show The Orion Experience, a sci-fi musical directed by Travis Greisler and set to a glam rock soundtrack by The Orion Experience. In its plot, that band's lead singer, Orion Simprini, goes on an intergalactic journey wherein he encounters various fantastical characters, including Davenport in her role of The Queen of White Lies. The play was well received both by critics and by the audience. A Theater Mania review summarized the show as being "like Here Lies Love or Fuerza Bruta, but with robots and space aliens instead of Filipina dictators or sexually ambiguous Argentineans." Greg Solomon of Theasy.com wrote, "The Orion Experience would appeal to anyone who is out to have a good time, regardless of their walk of life. The age range [of the audience] was from early 20s to late 70s and no one seemed out of place. The only complaint I can muster is that it could have lasted longer." Both The Electric Highway and The Orion Experience ran at the XL Nightclub in New York City.

In 2015, Davenport and Orion collaborated again, this time producing a single called "T.R.O.U.B.L.E". The same year, she appeared on an episode of Watch What Happens Live with Andy Cohen as a Whitney Houston impersonator. From 2017 to 2018, Davenport had the leading role in Trinkets, an off-Broadway play about the lives of transsexual sex workers in Manhattan's Meatpacking District in the 1990s. She portrayed Diva, a veteran prostitute who takes another character under her wing. The show was directed by Paul E. Alexander of The Ones, also starred Kevin Aviance, and ran at the Gene Frankel Theatre. Reviews were mixed: Adrienne Sowers of The Reviews Hub criticized Trinkets as lacking energy and plot cohesion, but she said the script had promise. Gay City News called the play "an ultimately euphoric but often sobering musical that shines a well-lit, long-overdue spotlight on drag and transsexual prostitutes during an era of uneasy cultural visibility".

RuPaul's Drag Race 

After auditioning for RuPaul's Drag Race eight times, Davenport was selected as one of 15 contestants for the show's 11th season, which premiered on February 28, 2019. The invitation to compete came at a difficult time for her: she was homeless and having troubles in her marriage, and one of her mentors was in a coma. She borrowed about $20,000 from friends in order to commission the runway outfits she brought to the competition. For the season's first main challenge, a photo shoot, she was paired with her mentor Manila Luzon, who placed as runner-up on the third season of Drag Race and competed on the first and fourth seasons of RuPaul's Drag Race All Stars. Davenport was eliminated in the series' first-ever six-way Lip Sync for Your Life, exiting in season 11's third episode as the 13th-place finisher.

One of Davenport's drag daughters, Monét X Change, competed on the 10th season of RuPaul's Drag Race and won the fourth season of RuPaul's Drag Race All Stars. Two of Davenport's drag aunts have also appeared on the show: Sahara Davenport, who competed on season 2 of the regular series, and Kennedy Davenport, who competed on season 7 of the regular series and placed as runner-up on season 3 of All Stars. Fellow season 11 contestants Ra'Jah O'Hara and A'keria C. Davenport are also members of the Davenport drag family.

Raw and Unfiltered 

Davenport's 2019 visual EP, Raw and Unfiltered, treats the subject of being a queer person of color in America. It was produced by Chew Fu. Davenport released each of the songs from Raw and Unfiltered during the airing of Drag Race season 11; the corresponding music videos showcase the looks she would have worn in the episodes following her elimination from the show. The first single and video combination off the EP, titled "The Hive", came out during the second week of the season. Davenport co-wrote "The Hive" with Jayse Vegas, a frequent collaborator who has featured her in his own songs and music videos. The fifth track on Raw and Unfiltered, "Cocoa Butter", was co-produced by Davenport; Vegas; Will Sheridan; Nedra Belle (of The Voice season 13); and Kareem McJagger, another longtime collaborator who is also Davenport's drag daughter. The video for "Cocoa Butter" won a Glam Award. The final track on Raw and Unfiltered, "Worship Me", was written by Orion Simprini. In July 2019, Davenport performed a theatrical concert adaptation of Raw and Unfiltered at the Laurie Beechman Theatre, an off-off-Broadway venue in Manhattan. The show had a three-date run.

2019: Post-Drag Race endeavors 

In spring 2019, Davenport released the first season of her weekly YouTube series and podcast, Da Fuq. That May, she released "Stan for You", a Pride-themed single and music video featuring Drag Race season 11 winner Yvie Oddly. Over the summer, she participated in the RuPaul's Drag Race Season 11 Tour, performing around the U.S. with other competitors from her season. She had an out-of-drag cameo role in Eureka O'Hara's August 2019 music video "Pretty Hot and Tasty". The first week in September, Davenport was featured on the cover of Get Out! Magazine. The issue included a piece she wrote about the life changes she underwent after Drag Race. Around the same time, she appeared in the music video for Lovari and Adam Barta's song "No Day Like Today".

Davenport traveled to Australia in October 2019 to partake in Pride events and raise awareness for queer people of color on that continent. In an interview with DNA magazine, she said, "It is really important to me that my people are represented all over the world. People of colour are a part of every community not just in America and the people here are just as important to me as the ones back home." During the visit, she appeared at the first-ever Black Pride Awards in Cairns, becoming the first RuPaul's Drag Race alumna to perform in that city. After the activism leg of her trip, she joined six other Drag Race season 11 contestants and season 2 runner-up Raven for The Sickening Ball tour, a Halloween-themed drag production with stops in Australia and New Zealand.

In November 2019, Trustpilot, a consumer review website, unveiled an ad campaign featuring Davenport on billboards and in a commercial. In the campaign, a female monarch resembling Queen Elizabeth II purchases jewelry online, guided by Davenport's product review. Later that month, Davenport and Peppermint served as guest panelists on the VH1 online miniseries Black Girl Beauty. The series takes the form of a round-table discussion that "gives celebrities, influencers and VH1 stars an opportunity to have their say on issues that define [b]lack women's beauty". During the 2019 holiday season, Davenport starred in Stocking Stuffer: A Christmas Show with Balls, her second one-woman show at the Laurie Beechman Theatre. Its closing night was held at Club Cumming. On Christmas Eve 2019, she released "Present (Tie You Down)", the first single off her upcoming studio album.

2020–2021: Music and online content during the COVID-19 pandemic 

In February 2020, Davenport and Aja released "Draw the Blood", a collaborative single whose music video marked Davenport's first directorial credit. The song, which debuted at number 26 on iTunes, focuses on the danger of bystander inaction in the face of racism, and its video features the personal experiences of Davenport and those close to her. The title references a metaphor indicating that those who do not intervene when they witness injustice have blood on their hands. Aja and Davenport each penned portions of the track, and Kareem McJagger wrote the hook. The video was included in Entertainment Weekly "fabulous collection of the RuPaul's Drag Race queens' best music videos".

The second season of Da Fuq premiered in April 2020. The same month, Jayse Vegas featured Davenport in a remix of his song "Energy", and Monique Heart featured her in the music video "Hot Sauce and High Heels (Kinky Boots Remix)". In May 2020, Billboard called Davenport's performance at RuPaul's Digital DragCon one of the seven best moments of the event. In June, she was featured in Socia(Lites)'s music video "Bitch Got Hips". Later that month, she debuted "Digital Rainbow", a single about celebrating Pride in the midst of the COVID-19 pandemic. The track features Oddly, Vegas, Widow Von'Du and Cazwell. Both the song and its accompanying music video were produced while Davenport and the featured artists were in quarantine; each person recorded their portion of the sound and video at home, and the clips were stitched together in post-production.

In August 2020, Davenport appeared in "Nerves of Steel", a music video by the English synth-pop duo Erasure. The video is a mashup of clips of prominent drag queens and other queer performers lip-syncing the song's lyrics. Later in the summer, she served as assistant director for Shuga Cain's September 2020 music video "Sweet Love". Because filming was completed in person during the pandemic, the video's cast is mostly masked. Shortly thereafter, Davenport re-released "Warrior", the second single off of Raw and Unfiltered, together with a full-length music video filmed in front of a green screen during quarantine. The video accompanying the song's initial release had been shorter due to budgetary restrictions.

In October, the cast of Shooting Star – A Revealing New Musical featured Davenport, Alaska Thunderfuck and Miss Coco Peru in a music video medley "to raise COVID-19 relief aid for Broadway Cares/Equity Fights AIDS and Pineapple Support". The same month, Davenport appeared in Divas for Democracy: United We Slay, a digital variety show featuring Broadway names like Chita Rivera and Harvey Fierstein as well as Drag Race stars including Bianca Del Rio, Jinkx Monsoon and Jujubee. The show encouraged Americans to vote in the 2020 United States presidential election. Shortly before Halloween, Davenport and Loris (of The Boulet Brothers' Dragula) released a collaborative single and music video called "Freaky Planet".

, Davenport hosts a monthly Twitch show called Something of a Different Color, which features a cast of POC performers. The third season of Da Fuq premiered in May of that year.

2022: Love Is God and upcoming projects 

In November 2021, Davenport and Manila Luzon released a collaborative single and music video called "Love Is God", the first song off of Davenport's five-track EP of the same name, which debuted in January 2022. Love Is God spans genres including pop, disco, house and reggaeton, and it features collaborations with Kevin Aviance, LaLa Ri, Jackie Cox and Tammie Brown. The music video for "Thrive", the track with Aviance, was released together with the EP. A short musical film titled Love Is God: The Visual Album, consisting of "a story woven together by all the songs on the EP", is slated to come out later in 2022. Davenport directed the film.

Davenport is soon to release a line of perfume called Pollen 8 and a makeup line called Bee Yourself. She has a co-starring role in God Save the Queens, a feature-length film set to premiere at the Palm Springs International Film Festival in January 2023. The film "[will follow] three different Drag Queens, in LA, New York and Las Vegas, all navigating their way through their careers and personal struggles". Davenport is also working on a musical collaboration with Jan Sport and a podcast called The Wake and Bake with Jasmine Masters.

Activism 

Davenport has said that it is important to her to use her career in drag to help others, and she often bases her looks, performances and music on political themes. In an interview with Entertainment Weekly, she stated, "I like to use my drag as a platform for the voiceless; for women, people of color, and those who aren't being heard." She has been particularly outspoken about racial equality and gun control, motivated by the impact that racism and gun violence have had on her life since childhood.

In November 2018, Davenport led the We Vote parade, a procession through New York City that encouraged Americans to vote in the 2018 midterm elections. The final runway look she wore on Drag Race was an homage to an outfit Lady Gaga wore while performing "Angel Down", a tribute to Trayvon Martin. In fall 2019, Davenport and other former Miss'd America titleholders spoke out against the pageant's decision to introduce a rule banning trans women from competing. Davenport told Instinct magazine: 

On the subject of Drag Race's lack of trans contestants, Davenport said, "[I]t is all of our responsibility to deal with that. I don't think that it's wise for us to point the finger. It's Drag Race's opportunity to accept trans people, but it's all of our social obligation to create this platforms ."

At the start of the 2020 George Floyd protests, Davenport teamed up with two fellow New York City drag queens, Dèvo Monique and Marti Gould Cummings, to ask every queer venue in the city to pledge to hire more black staff and entertainment. In a June 2020 interview, she described an incident in which she was subjected to police brutality in Harlem. She said that roughly ten years earlier ( 2010), she had been on her way to the supermarket when she was apprehended by police officers, thrown to the ground, and handcuffed. One officer placed a knee on her neck while another searched her. When they did not find anything on her person, they told her they had stopped her because her profile matched a description they had received. Davenport asked the officers if they would apologize for what they had done to her, and they replied, "You should be happy you're not going to jail today." The event served as one of the inspirations for "Draw the Blood", which features a reenactment of Davenport's encounter with the police in its music video.

Monster Bar controversy 

In September and October 2018, Davenport was at the center of a controversy over racist practices at The Monster, a popular gay bar in New York City's West Village, where she had hosted a weekly show called "Manster" for six years. The incident began in late September 2018, when bar manager Italo Lopez sent text messages to Davenport's manager, DJ Mitch Ferrino, indicating that a flyer for "Manster" appeared to be promoting a "black night" and that this was bad for business. Lopez also said that the two black dancers on the flyer needed to be replaced by someone "beautiful" and that the image of Davenport herself needed to be smaller. After Ferrino showed Davenport the messages, she reached out to bar owner Charles Rice with concerns about the overtones of Lopez's words, but Rice did not respond. Following this, on September 29, 2018, Davenport appeared at "Manster" as planned. However, instead of performing, she announced she would no longer be able to work at The Monster. She shared what Lopez had said with the audience and ended her two-minute speech by stating, "I cannot be a part of this anymore. If you don't want my people at the party, I won't be here."

Shortly thereafter, a number of other drag queens canceled their regular shows at The Monster. Ferrino also withdrew his weekly event LookQueen, which was started in 2014 by Bob the Drag Queen, from the bar. LookQueen's acting host, Shuga Cain, had urged Ferrino to do so. Rice initially blamed Ferrino and Davenport for the backlash he experienced, calling the incident a smear campaign that he ascribed to Ferrino "[having] an axe to grind with [Lopez]". He further stated that he believed Ferrino should not have shown Lopez's messages to Davenport, chalking up their content to a miscommunication stemming from Lopez's non-native English. Later on, Rice apologized, and Lopez resigned from his position. Rice arranged for staff at The Monster to undergo racial sensitivity training, but he declined Davenport's invitation to have a moderated public discussion about the matter.

Personal life 

Having known he was gay for most of his life, Heath-Clark said, "The first person I ever came out to was my godfather and math teacher—my Uncle John. He overheard me in the classroom being attacked for my sexual orientation, and afterwards, he promised me that even if what he heard was true, he would always have my back." Heath-Clark came out to his mother at age 19, when he called her to talk after breaking up with his first boyfriend. Her response was supportive. Though she embraced him as a gay man, she was initially unhappy with his decision to pursue drag, but she changed her mind after seeing him perform. Heath-Clark's father learned he was a drag queen years later, in 2013, when he visited New York to see Heath-Clark act in The Orion Experience. He responded with enthusiasm and support.

Heath-Clark and his husband, John, wed on December 31, 2012, at the Hartley House in Hell's Kitchen. The two have a pet cat. Heath-Clark resided in New York City until late 2019, when he relocated to Los Angeles following the airing of his season of Drag Race. Prior to the COVID-19 pandemic, he continued to work in both cities, traveling regularly between them. Hollywood director Lee Daniels, who created the television series Empire and produced the films Monster's Ball and Precious, is Heath-Clark's cousin.

Heath-Clark identifies as non-binary and pansexual. As of May 2020, he keeps a vegan diet. He stopped drinking alcohol a few months after filming Drag Race but later resumed its consumption. He has stated that he suffers from anxiety.

Discography

Studio albums

EPs

Singles

As lead artist

As featured artist

Filmography

Film

Television

Internet series

Music videos

As lead artist or director

Featured and cameo roles

Theatre

See also 
 LGBT culture in New York City
 List of LGBT people from New York City

References

Citations

Audiovisual sources

External links 

 
 
 

1985 births
Living people
21st-century African-American singers
African-American DJs
African-American drag queens
American anti-racism activists
American LGBT singers
Articles containing video clips
Entertainers from New York City
Gay entertainers
LGBT African Americans
LGBT DJs
LGBT people from New York (state)
LGBT people from Pennsylvania
Non-binary activists
Non-binary drag performers
Non-binary musicians
Pansexual non-binary people
People from Philadelphia
Honey Davenport
Singers from New York City
Singers from Pennsylvania